The anterior labial nerves are branches of the ilioinguinal nerve.  The nerves innervate the mons pubis and labium majus in females. The equivalent nerves in the male are the anterior scrotal nerves.

See also
 Posterior labial nerves

Nerves of the lower limb and lower torso